The Ministry of Finance of Ukraine is the ministry of the Ukrainian government charged with developing and implementing national financial and budget policies, and with defining national policies in customs and taxation. The ministry is responsible for ensuring that the state has enough resources to perform its functions and that financial policies promote economic growth.

Role 

Specific tasks that the ministry has to perform include:
regulating financial, budgeting, customs and taxation affairs, 
regulating administration of Ukraine’s single social insurance tax;
defining state policy for combating violations of tax and customs law;
defining state policy for combating laundering proceeds from crime and financing of terrorism; cooperating with the Financial Action Task Force on Money Laundering and other international organisations in this area;
regulating issues related to financial control, state treasury administration of public funds, accounting and accounting standards, running lotteries, issuing securities and strict accounting documents, handling of precious metals and gems;
analysing and forecasting public revenue, drafting mid-term Budget Declarations and annual Budget Laws; 
coordinating implementation of the State Budget;
setting guidelines for budget planning; enhancing effectiveness of public financial management;
managing public and state-guaranteed debt;
regulating intergovernmental fiscal relations; greenlighting sub-national borrowing and provision of debt guarantees by local governments;
informing general public on economic and fiscal policies of the state, as well as on the results of implementing the state’s budget;
assessing financial viability of regional development projects;
management of state-owned banks;
defining and implementing national policy on development of financial services, development of state-owned banks, other financial institutions;
cooperating with the International Monetary Fund and other international financial organisations.

Senior leadership

Structure
Minister of Finance:
Minister’s Office;
Department for Strategic planning and European integration;
State budget department;
Local budgets department;
Department for harmonization of state internal financial control;
Department of financial and economic affairs, accounting and financial reporting;
Department public and government relations;
Legal department;
Department for analysis and communications;
Internal audit department;
Anti-corruption department;
Mobilisation department;
Classified records office;
Deputy Minister, customs and taxation:
Department for taxation policy;
Department for database monitoring and verification of budget payments;
Department for revenue forecasting and accounting standards;
Department for assay control and strict accounting documents;
Deputy Minister, energy and fiscal risks
Department for fuel and energy;
Department for industrial expenditure;
Department for public debt management; 
Department for fiscal risks management;
Department for cash management.
Deputy Minister, social and humanitarian affairs:
Department for management of expenditure in humanitarian sectors;
Department for management of expenditure in social sectors;
Department for management of expenditure of government agencies. 
Deputy Minister, defense and security:
Department for management of expenditure on defense, state security and law enforcement.
Deputy Minister, financial policy and international cooperation
Financial policy department;
Department for international financial projects;
Department for international cooperation.
State Commissioner for public debt management:
Office of the State Commissioner for public debt management.
Acting State Secretary:
Department for Human resources and organizational management;
Department for submissions and procedural control;
Department of IT and information systems;
Administrative Office

Ministry agencies 

There are several central executive agencies in Ukraine which report to the Cabinet of Ministers through the Minister of Finance. These include:
 State Treasury Service;
State Tax Service;
State Customs Service;
State Financial Monitoring Service of Ukraine;
State Audit Service of Ukraine.

Note: Prior to 10 September 2014, the list of executive agencies under the Ministry of Finance also included the State Assay Service. This agency was closed down as part of the Government’s initiative to streamline the structure of executive agencies. Functions in assay control were split between the Ministry of Finance (implementing state assay control policy) and the State Service for Food Safety and Consumer Protection (protecting the rights of consumers of precious metals and gems).

Supporting establishments
 State gemological center of Ukraine
 State repository of precious metals and stones
 Museum of decorative and precious stones
 Kyiv Offset Factory
 Main planning and service center of computer financial technologies
 Administration in exploitation of assets complex
 Recreation site Koncha-Zaspa
 Administration Office in International Financial Cooperation projects
 Assay Control State Offices (Dnipro, Donetsk, Western, Crimean, Southern, Eastern, Central)

 Scientific-researching financial institute

List of ministers of finance of Ukraine

See also
 National Bank of Ukraine

References

External links 

 Official Website of the Ukrainian Ministry of Emergencies
 MinFin Ukraine - Official Twitter account of the Ministry of Finance of Ukraine

Finance
Finance
Ukraine
Ukraine, Finance
1990 establishments in Ukraine
Financial regulatory authorities of Ukraine
Government finances in Ukraine